The 1981 St. Louis mayoral election was held on April 7, 1981 to elect the mayor of St. Louis, Missouri. It saw the election of Vincent C. Schoemehl and the defeat of incumbent mayor James F. Conway in the Democratic primary.

The election was preceded by party primaries on March 3.

Democratic primary

General election

References

Mayoral elections in St. Louis
St. Louis
1981 in Missouri